Solving History with Olly Steeds is a weekly American documentary adventure reality television series that premiered on January 13, 2010 on the Discovery Channel.  Produced by JWM Productions, the program follows British explorer and investigative journalist Oliver Steeds as he travels around the world investigating historical claims and theories.

Episodes

Season 1 (2010)

International broadcasts
The show airs in the United Kingdom and Ireland under the title Mystery Investigator with Olly Steeds, which premiered on May 24, 2010 on Discovery Knowledge.  The show is also a huge hit in Asian market, with host Olly Steeds making several invited promotional appearances.

Reception
Common Sense Media gave the show 3 out of 5 stars.

See also
Mark & Olly: Living with the Tribes

References

External links

2010 American television series debuts
2010 American television series endings
2010s American documentary television series
2010s American reality television series
Discovery Channel original programming